78 Cancri is a star in the zodiac constellation of Cancer, located 548 light years from the Sun. It is too faint to be viewed with the naked eye, having an apparent visual magnitude of 7.19. The star is moving away from the Earth with a relatively large radial velocity of +77.7 km/s. It is an evolved giant star with a stellar classification of K3 III.

References

K-type giants
Cancer (constellation)
Durchmusterung objects
Cancri, 78
078479
044918